Milleria hamiltoni is a moth in the family Zygaenidae first described by Charles Swinhoe in 1891. It is mainly found in the Khasi Hills of Meghalaya, India.

References

Moths described in 1891
Chalcosiinae